Night Child (Swedish: Nattbarn) is a 1956 Swedish crime drama film directed by Gunnar Hellström and starring Hellström, Harriet Andersson, Erik Strandmark and Nils Hallberg. It was shot at the Centrumateljéerna Studios in Stockholm. The film's sets were designed by the art director Nils Nilsson.

Synopsis
A young man is paroled from prison and gets a good, stable job. However he is lured back into the criminal underworld of Stockholm.

Cast
 Gunnar Hellström as 	Nils Gustaf Boman
 Harriet Andersson as Wivan
 Erik Strandmark as 	Leo Devell
 Nils Hallberg as 	Sven Harry Kallen
 Birgitta Olzon as 	Eva Rehn
 Sven-Eric Gamble as 	'Count'
 Marianne Löfgren as 	Lätthammar
 Stig Järrel as 	Director Stenberg
 Märta Arbin as Nick's Mother
 Sven Almgren as Eva's Brother
 Bengt Eklund as Knotan
 Siv Ericks as Gittan
 Naemi Briese as Sonja 
 Björn Berglund as 	Lithman	
 Elsa Prawitz as Vera Gillman
 Åke Fridell as 	Eva's Father
 Ingrid Backlin as 	Eva's Mother
 Åke Claesson as 	Judge
 Olof Sandborg as 	Fritz
 Ragnar Sörman as 	Myran 
 Margit Andelius as Mrs. André
 Axel Högel as 	Mollberg
 Peter Lindgren as Bruno
 Göthe Grefbo as 	Machine Operator 
 Keve Hjelm as 	Berra
 Mona Åstrand as Barbro
 Ulla-Bella Fridh as 	Britt 
 David Erikson as 	Supervisor 
 Sven Holmberg as 	Maitre d'
 Elsa Ebbesen as Woman
 Georg Skarstedt as 	Night Watchman
 Per-Axel Arosenius as 	Plain-clothes Policeman 
 Ulf Johansson as Plain-clothes Policeman 
 Claes Thelander as Assistant Hair Dresser

References

Bibliography 
 Qvist, Per Olov & von Bagh, Peter. Guide to the Cinema of Sweden and Finland. Greenwood Publishing Group, 2000.
Segrave, Kerry & Martin, Linda.  The Continental Actress: European Film Stars of the Postwar Era--biographies, Criticism, Filmographies, Bibliographies. McFarland, 1990.

External links 
 

1956 films
Swedish crime drama films
1956 crime drama films
1950s Swedish-language films
Films directed by Gunnar Hellström
Films set in Stockholm
Films shot in Stockholm
1950s Swedish films
Swedish black-and-white films